Mutual bank or mutual banking may refer to

Mutual savings bank
Cooperative banking
Mutualism (economic theory)

See also
Mutual organization